Keijirō, Keijiro or Keijirou (written: 慶治朗, 啓二朗 or 敬次郎) is a masculine Japanese given name. Notable people with the name include:

, Japanese baseball player
, Japanese footballer
, Japanese sailor
, Japanese politician

Japanese masculine given names